Wofai Samuel (born 18 September 1990) is an international communications executive and media personality from Nigeria.

Early life and education 
Samuel was born in Calabar, Cross River State, where she attended the Federal Government Girls College and the University of Calabar in 2012 where she earned a Bachelor of Science degree in zoology and environmental biology. In 2021, Samuel obtained an advanced diploma in human resource management  and organisational development from the University of Lagos, Nigeria.

Career 
Samuel is the Director of Communication, Government Relations & Advocacy to the Nigerian-American Chamber of Commerce. Previously, she was director of communication and external affairs to the UK-Liberia Chamber of Commerce.

Samuel was appointed Head of Oil & Gas to Foreign Investment Network U.K, and organised a series of meetings for the upstream Petroleum industry in 2020, which attracted 22 countries, 21 petroleum and energy operating companies and 150 senior stakeholders. She was then profiled on Forbes Africa as "shaping the future of the continent".

She is the editor of Africa Energy & Infrastructure magazine.

She was then nominated for an honorary doctorate degree in leadership and management from the Commonwealth University of London, a private online college registered in Panama.

Communications 
Samuel moderated;

 Central bank of Nigeria cashless card expo forum (2016)
 West Africa power and energy awards (2016)
 Committee of e-Banking heads retreat (2016)
 Belarus-Africa forum, Minsk (2017)
 Nigeria assembly (2017)
 Oil trading logistics Africa downstream week (2017)
 African Export–Import Bank launch of project preparation facility, Johannesburg (2018)
 sub-Saharan Africa oil, energy and infrastructure summit, Nairobi (2018)
 Invest in Africa (2018)
 West Africa trade and export finance conference (2019)
 International produced water Africa conference (2019)
 Nigeria - Italy Forum (2019)
 West Africa Trade and Investment Conference (2019)
 West Africa Agriculture forum (2020)
 Forum for Africa finance, economy and compliance, Angola (2021)
 IOT West Africa (2022)
 Securex West Africa (2022)
 Women in Oil and Gas Conference (2022)
 Federal Ministry of Communication and Digital Economy Conference, Nigeria (2022)

Social service 
On 24 December 2020, Samuel was elected as the fourth communications chair for Young African Leaders Initiative, YALI RLC West Africa (Nigeria Alumnus), and sworn in as publicity secretary for the United States Government Exchange Alumni Association on 1 October 2021.

References 

University of Calabar alumni
Living people
1990 births
Nigerian media personalities
Nigerian television personalities
Nigerian broadcasters
Nigerian women in business
Broadcasting in Nigeria
Nigerian mass media people
21st-century Nigerian businesswomen
21st-century Nigerian businesspeople
People from Cross River State